The European Care Certificate (ECC) is a basic certificate for the social care sector. It is awarded  after passing an exam which is the same in all European countries.

History of the ECC 
The ECC has been developed during a project funded by the Lifelong Learning Programme in 2006. Today there are 15 European countries using and working on the further development of the ECC.

Countries involved 
The ECC is at the moment offered in the following countries of the European Union:
 Belgium
 Bulgaria
 Germany
 United Kingdom
 Ireland
 Italy
 Austria
 Portugal
 Romania
 Slovenia
 Czech Republic
 Hungary
 Cyprus
 Poland
 Latvia

Content of the exam 
The BESCLO (Basic European Social Care Learning Outcomes) covers 8 topics of the social care sector, which are:
1. The values of social care
2. Promote life quality for the individuals you support
3. Working with risk
4. Understand your role as a care worker
5. Safety at work
6. Communicating positively
7. Recognise and respond to abuse and neglect
8. Develop as a worker

Sources 
 www.europeancarecertificate.eu
 www.scie.org.uk
 www.easpd.eu

External links 
 www.europeancarecertificate.eu

European Union